Ángel Ruben Cabrera Santana (Mercedes, Uruguay, 9 October 1939 – 15 November 2010) was a Uruguayan football forward who played for Uruguay in the 1962 FIFA World Cup. He also played for C.A. Peñarol.

He died in 2010, aged 71. His remains are buried in Mercedes.

References

External links
FIFA profile

1939 births
2010 deaths
Uruguayan footballers
Uruguay international footballers
Association football forwards
Uruguayan Primera División players
Peñarol players
1962 FIFA World Cup players
Burials at the Municipal Cemetery, Mercedes